Yannick Bonheur (born 18 May 1982) is a French former competitive pair skater. He is a five-time French National Champion with three different partners: Marylin Pla, Vanessa James, and Adeline Canac.

Career

Partnership with Marylin Pla
Bonheur competed with Marylin Pla from 2002 until 2007. They won the French National Championships three times and placed 14th at the 2006 Winter Olympics. In the 2006–2007 season, they missed the Grand Prix series as a result of Bonheur's hand injury, which occurred while practicing the triple twist and led to surgery.

Partnership with Vanessa James
Bonheur teamed up with Canadian/American/French skater Vanessa James in December 2007. They began competing together internationally in 2008. James / Bonheur made their Grand Prix debut at the 2008 Trophée Eric Bompard, where they placed 7th. They placed 10th at the 2009 European Figure Skating Championships and 12th at the 2009 World Figure Skating Championships. In the 2009–2010 season, they placed 6th at the 2009 Nebelhorn Trophy, 8th at the 2009 Cup of China, and 8th at the 2009 Trophée Eric Bompard. At the 2010 French Figure Skating Championships, they placed second in the short program and won the free skating to win the title overall. As a result, they were sent to both the Olympics and Worlds, where they finished 14th and 12th, respectively. James and Bonheur were the first black pair to compete at the Olympics. They ended their partnership following the 2009–2010 season.

Partnership with Adeline Canac
Bonheur teamed up with Adeline Canac in spring 2010. Canac and Bonheur's first competition together was the 2010 Master's de Patinage, which they won. They went on to win bronze at the 2010 NRW Trophy and claimed their first national title together in December 2010. They then finished 9th at their first Europeans together and 18th at Worlds. In July 2011, it was reported that Canac and Bonheur had split.

Post-competition career
In 2013, Bonheur began a partnership with Annette Dytrt to work as an adagio pair in ice shows.

Programs

With Canac

With James

With Pla

With Stadelman

Competitive highlights

With Adeline Canac

With Vanessa James

With Marylin Pla

With Lucie Stadelman

References

External links 

 
 Canac / Bonheur at Tracings
 
 James / Bonheur at Tracings
 
 Pla / Bonheur at Tracings
 
 Stadelmann / Bonheur at Tracings

1982 births
Living people
People from Ivry-sur-Seine
French people of Martiniquais descent
French male pair skaters
Olympic figure skaters of France
Figure skaters at the 2006 Winter Olympics
Figure skaters at the 2010 Winter Olympics